Lipianki  is a village in the administrative district of Gmina Nowy Duninów, within Płock County, Masovian Voivodeship, in east-central Poland.

References

Lipianki